The Strauss–Howe generational theory, devised by William Strauss and Neil Howe, describes a theorized recurring generation cycle in American history and Western history. According to the theory, historical events are associated with recurring generational personas (archetypes). Each generational persona unleashes a new era (called a turning) lasting around 20–25 years, in which a new social, political, and economic climate (mood) exists. They are part of a larger cyclical "saeculum" (a long human life, which usually spans between 80 and 100 years, although some saecula have lasted longer). The theory states that a crisis recurs in American history after every saeculum, which is followed by a recovery (high). During this recovery, institutions and communitarian values are strong. Ultimately, succeeding generational archetypes attack and weaken institutions in the name of autonomy and individualism, which eventually creates a tumultuous political environment that ripens conditions for another crisis.

Strauss and Howe laid the groundwork for their theory in their book Generations: The History of America's Future, 1584 to 2069 (1991), which discusses the history of the United States as a series of generational biographies going back to 1584. In their book The Fourth Turning (1997), the authors expanded the theory to focus on a fourfold cycle of generational types and recurring mood eras to describe the history of the United States, including the Thirteen Colonies and their British antecedents. However, the authors have also examined generational trends elsewhere in the world and described similar cycles in several developed countries.

Academic response to the theory has been mixed, with some applauding Strauss and Howe for their "bold and imaginative thesis", while others have criticized the theory as being overly deterministic, unfalsifiable, and unsupported by rigorous evidence. Former U.S. Vice President Al Gore, who graduated from Harvard University with Strauss, called Generations the most stimulating book on American history he'd ever read. He even sent a copy to each member of Congress. The theory has been influential in the fields of generational studies, marketing, and business management literature. However, the theory has also been described by some historians and journalists as pseudoscientific, "kooky", and "an elaborate historical horoscope that will never withstand scholarly scrutiny". Academic criticism has focused on the lack of rigorous empirical evidence for their claims, as well as the authors' view that generational groupings are more powerful than other social groupings, such as economic class, race, sex, religion, and political parties.

History and works
William Strauss and Neil Howe's partnership began in the late 1980s when they began writing their first book Generations, which discusses the history of the United States as a succession of generational biographies. Each had written on generational topics: Strauss on Baby Boomers and the Vietnam War draft, and Howe on the G.I. Generation and federal entitlement programs. Strauss co-wrote two books with Lawrence Baskir about how the Vietnam War affected the Baby Boomers: Chance and Circumstance: The Draft, the War, and the Vietnam Generation (1978) and Reconciliation after Vietnam (1977). Neil Howe studied what he believed to be the U.S.'s entitlement attitude of the 1980s and co-authored On Borrowed Time: How the Growth in Entitlement Spending Threatens America's Future in 1988 with Peter George Peterson. The authors' interest in generations as a broader topic emerged after they met in Washington, D.C., and began discussing the connections between each of their previous works.

They wondered why Boomers and G.I.s had developed such different ways of looking at the world, and what it was about these generations' experiences growing up that prompted their different outlooks. They also wondered whether any previous generations had acted along similar lines, and their research discussed historical analogs to the current generations. They ultimately described a recurring pattern in the Anglo-American history of four generational types, each with a distinct collective persona, and a corresponding cycle of four different types of era, each with a distinct mood. The groundwork for this theory was laid out in Generations in 1991. Generations helped popularize the idea that people in a particular age group tend to share a distinct set of beliefs, attitudes, values, and behaviors because they all grow up and come of age during a particular period in history.

Strauss and Howe followed in 1993 with their second book 13th Gen: Abort, Retry, Ignore, Fail?, which was published while Gen Xers were young adults. The book examines the generation born between 1961 and 1981, "Gen-Xers" (which they called "13ers", describing them as the thirteenth generation since the US became a nation). The book asserts that 13ers' location in history as under-protected children during the Consciousness Revolution explains their pragmatic attitude. They describe Gen Xers as growing up during a time when society was less focused on children and more focused on adults and their self-actualization.

Strauss and Howe's theory provided historical information regarding living and past generations and made various predictions. Many of their predictions were regarding the Millennial Generation, who were young children when they began their work, thus lacking significant historical data. In Generations (1991) and The Fourth Turning (1997), the two authors discussed the generation gap between Baby Boomers and their parents and predicted there would be no such gap between Millennials and their elders. In 2000, they published Millennials Rising: The Next Great Generation. This work discussed the personality of the Millennial Generation, whose oldest members were described as the high school graduating class of the year 2000. In the 2000 book, Strauss and Howe asserted that Millennial teens and young adults were recasting the image of youth from "downbeat and alienated to upbeat and engaged". They credited increased parental attention and protection for these positive changes. They asserted Millennials are held to higher standards than adults apply to themselves and that they are a lot less vulgar and violent than the teen culture older people produce for them. They described them as less sexually charged and as ushering in a new sexual modesty, with an increasing belief that sex should be saved for marriage and a return to conservative family values. The authors predicted that over the following decade, Millennials would transform what it means to be young, and could emerge as the next "Great Generation". The book was described as an optimistic, feel-good book for the parents of the Millennial Generation, predominantly the Baby Boomers. A 2000 New York Times book review for this book titled: What's the Matter With Kids Today? Not a Thing, described the message of Millennials Rising as "we boomers are raising a cohort of kids who are smarter, more industrious and better behaved than any generation before", saying the book complimented the Baby Boomer cohort by complimenting their parenting skills.

In 1997, the authors published The Fourth Turning: An American Prophecy, which expanded on the ideas presented in Generations and extended their cycles back into the early 15th century. The authors also updated the terminology for generational archetypes (e.g. "Civics" became "Heroes", which they applied to the Millennial Generation, "Adaptives" became "Artists") and introduced terms "Turning" and "Saeculum" for the generational cycles. The title is a reference to what their first book called a Crisis period, which they expected to recur soon after the turn of the millennium.

In the mid-1990s, the authors began receiving inquiries about how their research could be applied to strategic problems in organizations. They established themselves as pioneers in a growing field and started speaking frequently about their work at events and conferences. In 1999, they founded LifeCourse Associates, a publishing, speaking, and consulting company built on their generational theory. They have also written six books in which they assert that the Millennial Generation is transforming various sectors, including schools, colleges, entertainment, and the workplace. 

On December 18, 2007, William Strauss died at the age of 60 from pancreatic cancer. Neil Howe continues to expand LifeCourse Associates and to write books and articles on a variety of generational topics. Each year Mr. Howe gives about 60 speeches, often followed by customized workshops, at colleges, elementary schools, and corporations. Neil Howe is a public policy adviser to the Blackstone Group, senior adviser to the Concord Coalition, and senior associate to the Center for Strategic and International Studies.

Steve Bannon, former Chief Strategist and Senior Counselor to former president Donald Trump is a prominent proponent of the theory. As a documentary filmmaker, Bannon discussed the details of Strauss–Howe generational theory in Generation Zero. According to historian David Kaiser, who was consulted for the film, Generation Zero "focused on the key aspect of their theory, the idea that every 80 years of American history has been marked by a crisis, or 'fourth turning', that destroyed an old order and created a new one". Kaiser said Bannon is "very familiar with Strauss and Howe's theory of crisis, and has been thinking about how to use it to achieve particular goals for quite a while." A February 2017 article from Business Insider titled: "Steve Bannon's obsession with a dark theory of history should be worrisome", commented: "Bannon seems to be trying to bring about the 'Fourth Turning'."

Neil Howe has a new book coming out in July 2023, titled The Fourth Turning Is Here.

Defining a generation
Strauss and Howe describe the history of the U.S. as a succession of Anglo-American generational biographies from 1435 to the present, and they describe a theorized recurring generational cycle in American history. The authors posit a pattern of four repeating phases, generational types, and a recurring cycle of spiritual awakenings and secular crises, from the founding colonials of America through the present day.

Strauss and Howe define a social generation as the aggregate of all people born over a span of roughly twenty years or about the length of one phase of life: childhood, young adulthood, midlife, and old age. Generations are identified (from the first birthyear to last) by looking for cohort groups of this length that share three criteria. First, members of a generation share what the authors call an age location in history: they encounter key historical events and social trends while occupying the same phase of life. In this view, members of a generation are shaped in lasting ways by the eras they encounter as children and young adults and they share certain common beliefs and behaviors. Aware of the experiences and traits that they share with their peers, members of a generation would also share a sense of common perceived membership in that generation.

They based their definition of a generation on the work of various writers and social thinkers, from ancient writers such as Polybius and Ibn Khaldun to modern social theorists such as José Ortega y Gasset, Karl Mannheim, John Stuart Mill, Émile Littré, Auguste Comte, and François Mentré.

Turnings
While writing Generations, Strauss and Howe described a theorized pattern in the historical generations they examined, which they say revolved around generational events which they call turnings. In Generations, and in greater detail in The Fourth Turning, they describe a four-stage cycle of social or mood eras which they call "turnings". The turnings include: "The High", "The Awakening", "The Unraveling" and "The Crisis".

High
According to Strauss and Howe, the First Turning is a High, which occurs after a Crisis. During The High, institutions are strong and individualism is weak. Society is confident about where it wants to go collectively, though those outside the majoritarian center often feel stifled by conformity.

According to the authors, the most recent First Turning in the US was the post–World War II American High, beginning in 1946 and ending with the assassination of John F. Kennedy on November 22, 1963.

Awakening
According to the theory, the Second Turning is an Awakening. This is an era when institutions are attacked in the name of personal and spiritual autonomy. Just when society is reaching its high tide of public progress, people suddenly tire of social discipline and want to recapture a sense of "self-awareness", "spirituality" and "personal authenticity". Young activists look back at the previous High as an era of cultural and spiritual poverty.

Strauss and Howe say the U.S.'s most recent Awakening was the "Consciousness Revolution", which spanned from the campus and inner-city revolts of the mid-1960s to the tax revolts of the early 1980s.

Unraveling
According to Strauss and Howe, the Third Turning is an Unraveling. The mood of this era they say is in many ways the opposite of a High: Institutions are weak and distrusted, while individualism is strong and flourishing. The authors say Highs come after Crises when society wants to coalesce and build and avoid the death and destruction of the previous crisis. Unravelings come after Awakenings when society wants to atomize and enjoy. They say the most recent Unraveling in the US began in the 1980s and includes the Long Boom and Culture War.

Crisis
According to the authors, the Fourth Turning is a Crisis. This is an era of destruction, often involving war or revolution, in which institutional life is destroyed and rebuilt in response to a perceived threat to the nation's survival. After the crisis, civic authority revives, cultural expression redirects toward community purpose, and people begin to locate themselves as members of a larger group.

The authors say the previous Fourth Turning in the US began with the Wall Street Crash of 1929 and climaxed with the end of World War II. The G.I. Generation (which they call a Hero archetype, born 1901 to 1924) came of age during this era. They say their confidence, optimism, and collective outlook epitomized the mood of that era. The authors assert the Millennial Generation (which they also describe as a Hero archetype, born 1982 to 2004) shows many similar traits to those of the G.I. youth, which they describe as including rising civic engagement, improving behavior, and collective confidence.

Cycle
The authors describe each turning as lasting about 20–22 years. Four turnings make up a full cycle of about 80 to 90 years, which the authors term a saeculum, after the Latin word meaning both "a long human life" and "a natural century".

Generational change drives the cycle of turnings and determines its periodicity. As each generation ages into the next life phase (and a new social role) society's mood and behavior fundamentally change, giving rise to a new turning. Therefore, a symbiotic relationship exists between historical events and generational personas. Historical events shape generations in childhood and young adulthood; then, as parents and leaders in midlife and old age, generations in turn shape history.

Each of the four turnings has a distinct mood that recurs every saeculum. Strauss and Howe describe these turnings as the "seasons of history". At one extreme is the Awakening, which is analogous to summer, and at the other extreme is the Crisis, which is analogous to winter. The turnings in between are transitional seasons, the High and the Unraveling are similar to spring and autumn, respectively. Strauss and Howe have discussed 26 theorized turnings over 7 saecula in Anglo-American history, from the year 1435 through today.

At the heart of Strauss and Howe's ideas is a basic alternation between two different types of eras, Crises and Awakenings. Both of these are defining eras in which people observe that historic events are radically altering their social environment. Crises are periods marked by major secular upheaval, when society focuses on reorganizing the outer world of institutions and public behavior (they say the last American Crisis was the period spanning the Great Depression and World War II). Awakenings are periods marked by cultural or religious renewal when society focuses on changing the inner world of values and private behavior (the last American Awakening was the "Consciousness Revolution" of the 1960s and 1970s).

During Crises, great peril provokes a societal consensus, an ethic of personal sacrifice, and strong institutional order. During Awakenings, an ethic of individualism emerges, and the institutional order is attacked by new social ideals and spiritual agendas. According to the authors, about every eighty to ninety years—the length of a long human life—a national Crisis occurs in American society. Roughly halfway to the next Crisis, a cultural Awakening occurs (historically, these have often been called Great Awakenings).

In describing this cycle of Crises and Awakenings, they draw from the work of other historians and social scientists who have also discussed long cycles in American and Europe history. The cycle of Crises corresponds with long cycles of war identified by such scholars as Arnold J. Toynbee, Quincy Wright, and L. L. Ferrar Jr., and with geopolitical cycles identified by William R. Thompson and George Modelski. Strauss and Howe say their cycle of Awakenings corresponds with Anthony Wallace's work on revitalization movements; they also say recurring Crises and Awakenings correspond with two-stroke cycles in politics (Walter Dean Burnham, Arthur Schlesinger Sr. and Jr.), foreign affairs (Frank L. Klingberg), and the economy (Nikolai Kondratieff) as well as with long-term oscillations in crime and substance abuse.

Archetypes
The authors say two different types of eras and two formative age locations associated with them (childhood and young adulthood) produce four generational archetypes that repeat sequentially, in rhythm with the cycle of Crises and Awakenings. In Generations, they refer to these four archetypes as Idealist, Reactive, Civic, and Adaptive. In The Fourth Turning (1997) they change this terminology to Prophet, Nomad, Hero, and Artist. They say the generations in each archetype not only share a similar age-location in history, but they also share some basic attitudes towards family, risk, culture and values, and civic engagement. In essence, generations shaped by similar early-life experiences develop similar collective personas and follow similar life trajectories. To date, Strauss and Howe have described 25 generations in Anglo-American history, each with a corresponding archetype. The authors describe the archetypes as follows:

Prophet

Prophet (Idealist) generations enter childhood during a High, a time of rejuvenated community life and consensus around a new societal order. Prophets grow up as the increasingly indulged children of this post-Crisis era, come of age as self-absorbed young crusaders of an Awakening, focus on morals and principles in midlife, and emerge as elders guiding another Crisis. Examples: Transcendental Generation, Missionary Generation, Baby Boomers.

Nomad
Nomad (Reactive) generations enter childhood during an Awakening, a time of social ideals and spiritual agendas when young adults are passionately attacking the established institutional order. Nomads grow up as under-protected children during this Awakening, come of age as alienated, post-Awakening young adults, become pragmatic midlife leaders during a Crisis, and age into resilient post-Crisis elders. Examples: Gilded Generation, Lost Generation, Generation X.

Hero

Hero (Civic) generations enter childhood during an Unraveling, a time of individual pragmatism, self-reliance, and laissez-faire. Heroes grow up as increasingly protected post-Awakening children, come of age as team-oriented young optimists during a Crisis, emerge as energetic, overly confident mid-lifers, and age into politically powerful elders attacked by another Awakening. Examples: Republican Generation, G.I. Generation, Millennials.

Artist
Artist (Adaptive) generations enter childhood during a Crisis, a time when great dangers cut down social and political complexity in favor of public consensus, aggressive institutions, and an ethic of personal sacrifice. Artists grow up overprotected by adults preoccupied with the Crisis, come of age as the socialized and conformist young adults of a post-Crisis world, break out as process-oriented midlife leaders during an Awakening, and age into thoughtful post-Awakening elders. Examples: Progressive Generation, Silent Generation, Homeland Generation.

Summary 
 An average life is 80 years and consists of four periods of ~20–22 years
 Childhood → Young adult → Midlife → Elderhood
 A generation is an aggregate of people born every ~20–22 years
 Baby Boomers → Gen X → Millennials → Homelanders
 Each generation experiences "four turnings" every ~80–90 years
 High → Awakening → Unraveling → Crisis
 A generation is considered "dominant" or "recessive" according to the turning experienced as young adults. But as a youth generation comes of age and defines its collective persona an opposing generational archetype is in its midlife peak of power.
 Dominant: independent behavior + attitudes in defining an era
 Recessive: dependent role in defining an era
 Dominant Generations
 Prophet (Idealist): Awakening as young adults. Awakening, defined: Institutions are attacked in the name of personal and spiritual autonomy
 Hero (Civic): Crisis as young adults. Crisis, defined: Institutional life is destroyed and rebuilt in response to a perceived threat to the nation's survival
 Recessive Generations
 Nomad (Reactive): Unraveling as young adults. Unraveling, defined: Institutions are weak and distrusted, individualism is strong and flourishing
 Artist (Adaptive): High [when they become] young adults. High, defined: Institutions are strong and individualism is weak

Generations

Late Medieval Saeculum

Arthurian Generation 
The Arthurian Generation was born between 1433 and 1460 and is of the hero archetype. Members of the generation grew up during England's retreat from France, during an era of rising civil unrest.

Humanist Generation 
The Humanist Generation was born between 1461 and 1482 and is of the artist/adaptive archetype.

This generation came of age at the height of the Middle Ages, just prior to the Reformation and Renaissance. For the educated classes life was fairly static, with Renaissance Humanist teaching and a clear career path through the church or State bureaucracy becoming increasingly available for the educated middle classes. Humanist influences took hold across Europe, and in many ways prepared the intellectual landscape for the coming reformation. Their youth coincided with the development of the European Printing press allowing greater dissemination of knowledge.

According to Strauss and Howe, those who constituted this generation had a sheltered childhood during a bloody civil war and were educated abroad, becoming Greek language tutors, international scholars, poets, prelates, and literate merchants and yeomen. The education produced by the humanist generation has been described as focused on the qualitative and the subjective, rather than the quantitative and the objective.

Some of the notable persons who influenced this generation include Thomas More, Erasmus, Thomas Linacre, John Colet, Cardinal Wolsey, Michelangelo, Copernicus, Francisco Pizarro and Cesare Borgia. King Edward V was also born into this generation, but as he died at only 15 years old, it is difficult to properly place him in this archetype. However, according to the historian Dominic Mancini Edward was very fascinated with science and philosophy, and was very well learned beyond his years.

Reformation Saeculum

Reformation Generation 

The Reformation Generation generation was born between 1483 and 1511 and is of the prophet archetype. This generation rebeled as youths, prompting the first colleges in the 1520s.

Reprisal Generation 
The Reprisal Generation was born between 1512 and 1540 and is of the nomad/reactive archetype. They spent their childhood amid religious frenzy and widespread erosion of social authority—and came of age in a cynical, post-Awakening era of cut-throat politics and roller-coaster markets. They crewed the ships during the wars of the Spanish Armada and saw the expansion of British territories and colonization in the New World overseas.

Elizabethan Generation 
The Elizabethan Generation was born between 1541 and 1565 and is of the hero archetype. They benefited as children from explosive growth in academies intended to transform them into perfect people of civic achievement and teamwork. They came to age during the Anglo-Spanish War (1585-1604). They regulated commerce, explored overseas empires, built English country houses, pursued science, and wrote poetry that celebrated an orderly universe.

Parliamentary Generation 
The Parliamentary Generation was born between 1566 and 1587 and is of the artist archetype. Their childhoods took place during an era of foreign threats and war. They built impeccable credentials in law, scholarship, religion, and arts and crafts guilds.

New World Saeculum

Puritan Generation 
The Puritan Generation was born between 1588 and 1617 and is of the prophet archetype. Members of the generation were led through the Wars of the Three Kingdoms (1639-1651) by King Charles I and others led a large migration to the Americas. The generation was very religious.

Cavalier Generation 

The Cavalier Generation was born from 1618 to 1647 and was of the nomad archetype. Members of this generation grew up in an era of religious upheaval and family collapse. Their generation was notoriously violent and uneducated, causing men to take great risks, and resulting in many young deaths.

Glorious Generation 
The Glorious Generation was born from 1648 to 1673 and was of the hero archetype. They had a protected childhood with tax-supported schools and new laws discouraging the kidnapping of young servants. After proving their worth in the Indian Wars and triumphing in the Glorious Revolution, they were rewarded with an electoral office at a young age. As young adults, they took pride in the growing political, commercial, and scientific achievements of England. They designed insurance, paper money, and public works.

Enlightenment Generation 
The Enlightenment Generation''' was born between 1674 and 1700 and was of the artist archetype. They grew up as protected children when families were close, youth risk discouraged, and good educations and well-connected marriages highly prized. As adults, they provided America's first large cadre of credentialed professionals, political managers, and plantation administrators. Examples in Europe include George Frederic Handel, Antonio Vivaldi, Domenico Scarlatti, and Johann Sebastian Bach.

 Revolutionary Saeculum 
 Awakening Generation 
The Awakening Generation was born between 1701 and 1723 and was of the prophet archetype. They were the first colonial generation to consist mostly of the offspring of native-born parents. As adults, they attacked their elders' moral complacency in a spiritual firestorm.

 Liberty Generation 

Strauss and Howe define The Liberty Generation (nomad archetype) as those born between 1724 and 1741. George Washington and Patrick Henry were born during this period. Also born in this era were 35 out of the 56 signatories of the United States Declaration of Independence, including John Adams.

 Republican Generation 
The Republican Generation (hero archetype) was born between 1742 and 1766. This generation is known for participating in several global revolutionary movements during the Age of Revolution. This generation witnessed political turmoil in response to growing British imperialism, and the vast social inequalities exacerbated by ruthless competition between European Monarchists.

They came of age during British imperialism and during a time when the viability of mercantilism was being questioned. Relying on Enlightenment philosophy, they unleashed violent episodes of revolution, vilified Monarchy, and promoted Republicanism. In colonial America, they participated in the American Revolutionary War, secured Independence from British rule, and established a libertarian system of governance, based on constitutional republicanism and representative democracy. Notable persons affiliated with this generation include the leading figures in the early years of the independent United States Thomas Jefferson, James Madison, James Monroe, and Alexander Hamilton as well as the leading figures of the French Revolution Maximilien Robespierre, Georges Danton and Camille Desmoulins.

 Compromise Generation 
The Compromise Generation was born between 1767 and 1791 and was of the artist archetype. They "rocked in the cradle of the Revolution" as they watched brave adults struggle and triumph. Notable persons affiliated with this generation include Andrew Jackson, Napoleon Bonaparte and Simón Bolívar.

 Civil War Saeculum 
 Transcendental Generation 
The Transcendental Generation was born between 1792 and 1821 and was of the prophet archetype. They started the Second Great Awakening across the United States.

 Gilded Generation 

Strauss and Howe define the Gilded Generation (nomad archetype) as those born from 1822 to 1842. They came of age amid rising national tempers, torrential immigration, rampant commercialism, conspicuous consumerism, declining college enrollment, and economic disputes. This led to a distrust of zealotry and institutional involvement, shifting focus to a life of materialism.. Most American Civil War soldiers were born during this period (the average age was 26).

 Progressive Generation 
The Progressive Generation (hero and artist archetypes) was born from 1843 to 1859 and grew up or fought during the American Civil War.

 Great Power Saeculum 
 Missionary Generation 

The Missionary Generation was born from 1860 to 1882 and is of the prophet/idealist archetype. Members of the Missionary Generation have been described as the "home-and-hearth children of the post-Civil War era". They were an idealist generation and as young adults, their leaders were famous preachers. Some were graduates of newly formed black and women's colleges. Their defining characteristics were missionary and social crusades: "Muckraker" journalism, prohibitionism, workers' rights, trade unionism and women's suffrage. In midlife, they developed Prohibition in the United States, immigration control, and organized vice squads.

Because the Lost Generation were so decimated by World War I, the leadership of the Missionary Generation lasted longer than previous generations and in the 1930s and 1940s, their elite became the "Wise Old Men" who enacted a "New Deal", Social Security, led the global war against fascism, and reaffirmed America's highest ideals during a transformative era in world history. This generation is fully ancestral, with the last known member of the Missionary Generation, the American Sarah Knauss, having died on December 30, 1999, at 119 years of age.

 Lost Generation 

The Lost Generation (nomad archetype) is the generation that came of age during World War I. "Lost" in this context also means "disoriented, wandering, directionless"—a recognition that there was great confusion and aimlessness among the war's survivors in the early post-war years. Strauss and Howe define the cohort as individuals born between 1883 and 1900.

 G.I. Generation 

The Greatest Generation (hero archetype), also known as the G.I. Generation and the World War II generation, is the demographic cohort following the Lost Generation and preceding the Silent Generation. Strauss and Howe define the cohort as individuals born between 1901 and 1924. They were shaped by the Great Depression and were the primary participants in World War II.

 Silent Generation 

The Silent Generation (artist archetype) is the demographic cohort following the Greatest Generation and preceding the baby boomers. Strauss and Howe define the cohort as individuals born between 1925 and 1942.

 Millennial Saeculum 
 Baby Boom Generation 

Strauss and Howe define the Baby Boom Generation as those born from 1943 to 1960.

 13th Generation 

Strauss and Howe define the 13th Generation as those born from 1961 to 1981.

 Millennial Generation 

Strauss and Howe define the Millennial Generation as those born from 1982 to 2004.

 Homeland Generation 

Strauss and Howe define the Homeland Generation as those born from 2005 onwards.

 Timing of generations and turnings 
The authors argue that the basic length of both generations and turnings—about twenty years—derives from longstanding socially and biologically determined phases of life. This is the reason it has remained relatively constant over centuries. Some have argued that rapid increases in technology in recent decades are shortening the length of a generation. According to Strauss and Howe, however, this is not the case. As long as the transition to adulthood occurs around age 20, the transition to midlife around age 40, and the transition to old age around age 60, they say the basic length of both generations and turnings will remain the same.

In their book, The Fourth Turning, however, Strauss and Howe say that the precise boundaries of generations and turnings are erratic. The generational rhythm is not like certain simple, inorganic cycles in physics or astronomy, where time and periodicity can be predicted to the second. Instead, it resembles the complex, organic cycles of biology, where basic intervals endure but precise timing is difficult to predict. Strauss and Howe compare the saecular rhythm to the four seasons, which they say similarly occur in the same order, but with slightly varying timing. Just as winter may come sooner or later, and be more or less severe in any given year, the same is true of a Fourth Turning in any given saeculum.

Critical reception
The Strauss and Howe retelling of history through a generational lens has received mixed reviews. Many reviewers have praised the authors for their ambition, erudition, and accessibility. For example, former U.S. Vice President Al Gore, who graduated from Harvard University with Strauss, called Generations: The History of America's Future, 1584 to 2069 the most stimulating book on American history he'd ever read. He even sent a copy to each member of Congress. The theory has been influential in the fields of generational studies, marketing, and business management literature. However, it has also been criticized by several historians and some political scientists, and journalists, as being overly deterministic, non-falsifiable, and unsupported by rigorous evidence.

Generations: The History of America's Future, 1584 to 2069
After the publication of their first book Generations, Martin Keller a professor of history at Brandeis University, said that the authors "had done their homework". He said that their theory could be seen as pop sociology and that it would "come in for a lot more criticism as history. But it's almost always true that the broader you cast your net, the more holes it's going to have. And I admire [the authors'] boldness." Sociologist David Riesman and political scientist Richard Neustadt offered strong, if qualified, praise. Riesman found in the work an "impressive grasp of a great many theoretical and historical bits and pieces" and Neustadt said Strauss and Howe "are asking damned important questions, and I honor them."The Times Literary Supplement called it "fascinating" and "about as vague and plausible as astrological predictions". Publishers Weekly called it "as woolly as a newspaper horoscope".

In 1991, Jonathan Alter wrote in Newsweek that Generations was a "provocative, erudite and engaging analysis of the rhythms of American life". However, he believed it was also "an elaborate historical horoscope that will never withstand scholarly scrutiny." He continued, "these sequential 'peer personalities' are often silly, but the book provides reams of fresh evidence that American history is indeed cyclical, as Arthur Schlesinger Jr. and others have long argued." But he complained, "The generational boundaries are plainly arbitrary. The authors lump together everyone born from 1943 through the end of 1960 (Baby Boomers), a group whose two extremes have little in common. And the predictions are facile and reckless." He concluded: "However fun and informative, the truth about generational generalizations is that they're generally unsatisfactory." Arthur E. Levine, a former president of the Teachers College of Columbia University said "Generational images are stereotypes. There are some differences that stand out, but there are more similarities between students of the past and the present. But if you wrote a book saying that, how interesting would it be?"

In response to criticism that they stereotype or generalize all members of a generation, the authors have said, "We've never tried to say that any individual generation is going to be monochromatic. It'll obviously include all kinds of people. But as you look at generations as social units, we consider it to be at least as powerful and, in our view, far more powerful than other social groupings such as economic class, race, sex, religion, and political parties."

Gerald Pershall wrote in 1991: "Generations is guaranteed to attract pop history and pop social science buffs. Among professional historians, it faces a tougher sell. Period specialists will resist the idea that their period is akin to several others. Sweeping theories of history are long out of fashion in the halls of ivy, and the authors' lack of academic standing won't help their cause. Their generational quartet is "just too wooden" and "too neat," says one Yale historian. "Prediction is for prophets," scoffed William McLoughlin (a former history professor at Brown), who said it is wrong to think that "if you put enough data together and have enough charts and graphs, you've made history into a science." He also said the book might get a friendlier reception in the sociology and political science departments than in the science department.

In 1991, professor and New York Times writer Jay Dolan critiqued Generations for not talking more about class, race, and sex, to which Neil Howe replied that they "are probably generalizations not even as effective as a generation to say something about how people think and behave. One of the things to understand is that most historians never look at history in terms of generations. They prefer to tell history as a seamless row of 55-year-old leaders who always tend to think and behave the same way -- but they don't and they never have. If you look at the way America's 55-year-old leaders were acting in the 1960s -- you know, the ebullience and confidence of the JFKs and LBJs and Hubert Humphreys -- and compare them with today's leaders in Congress -- the indecision, the lack of sure-footedness -- I think you would have to agree that 55-year-olds do not always act the same way and you're dealing with powerful generational forces at work that explain why one generation of war veterans, war heroes, and another generation which came of age in very different circumstances tend to have very different instincts about acting in the world."

Responding to criticisms in 1991, William Strauss accepted that some historians might not like their theory, which they presented as a new paradigm for looking at American history, that filled a need for a unifying vision of American history:

The Fourth Turning
In his review for the Boston Globe, historian David Kaiser called The Fourth Turning "a provocative and immensely entertaining outline of American history, Strauss and Howe have taken a gamble". "If the United States calmly makes it to 2015, their work will end up in the ashcan of history, but if they are right, they will take their place among the great American prophets." Kaiser has since argued that Strauss and Howe's predictions of coming crisis seems to have occurred, citing events such as 9/11, the 2008 financial crisis, and the recent political gridlock.

Kaiser has incorporated Strauss and Howe's theory in two historical works of his own, American Tragedy: Kennedy, Johnson, and the Origins of the Vietnam War (2000), and No End Save Victory: How FDR Led the Nation into War (2014). Michael Lind, a historian and co-founder of the New America Foundation, wrote that The Fourth Turning (1997) was vague and verged into the realm of "pseudoscience"; "most of the authors' predictions about the American future turn out to be as vague as those of fortune cookies". Lind said that the theory is essential "non-falsifiable" and "mystifying," although he believed the authors did have some insights into modern American history.

For The New York Times in 2017, Pulitzer-winning journalist Jeremy Peters wrote that "many academic historians dismiss the book as about as scientific as astrology or a Nostradamus text."

13th Gen
In 1993, Andrew Leonard reviewed the book 13th Gen: Abort, Retry, Ignore, Fail?. He wrote "as the authors (Strauss and Howe) relentlessly attack the iniquitous 'child-abusive culture' of the 1960s and '70s and exult in heaping insult after insult on their own generation -- they caricature Baby Boomers as countercultural, long-haired, sex-obsessed hedonists -- their real agenda begins to surface. That agenda becomes clear in part of their wish list for how the 13th generation may influence the future: "13ers will reverse the frenzied and centrifugal cultural directions of their younger years. They will clean up entertainment, de-diversify the culture, reinvent core symbols of national unity, reaffirm rituals of family and neighborhood bonding, and re-erect barriers to cushion communities from unwanted upheaval."

Again in 1993, writing for The Globe and Mail, Jim Cormier reviewed the same book: "self-described boomers Howe and Strauss add no profound layer of analysis to previous pop press observations. But in cobbling together a more extensive overview of the problems and concerns of the group they call the 13ers, they've created a valuable primer for other fogeys who are feeling seriously out of touch." Cormier wrote that the authors "raised as many new questions as answers about the generation that doesn't want to be a generation. But at least they've made an honest, empathetic, and good-humoured effort to bridge the bitter gap between the twentysomethings and fortysomethings."

In 1993, Charles Laurence at the London Daily Telegraph wrote that, in 13th Gen, Strauss and Howe offered this youth generation "a relatively neutral definition as the 13th American generation from the Founding Fathers,". According to Alexander Ferron's review in Eye Magazine, "13th Gen is best read as the work of two top-level historians. While its agenda is the 13th generation, it can also be seen as an incredibly well-written and exhaustive history of America from 1960 to 1981--examining the era through everything except the traditional historical subjects (war, politics, famine, etc)."

In 2011, Jon D. Miller, at the Longitudinal Study of American Youth, funded by the National Science Foundation, wrote that their birth year definition (1961 to 1981) of "Generation X" ("13th Gen") has been widely used in popular and academic literature.

Millennials Rising
David Brooks reviewed the follow-up book about the next generation titled Millennials Rising (2000). "Millennials" is a term coined by Strauss and Howe. Brooks wrote: "This is not a good book, if by good you mean the kind of book in which the authors have rigorously sifted the evidence and carefully supported their assertions with data. But it is a very good bad book. It's stuffed with interesting nuggets. It's brightly written. And if you get away from the generational mumbo jumbo, it illuminates changes that really do seem to be taking place." Further, Brooks wrote that the generations aren't treated equally: "Basically, it sounds as if America has two greatest generations at either end of the age scale and two crummiest in the middle".

In 2001, reviewer Dina Gomez wrote in NEA Today that they make their case "convincingly," with "intriguing analysis of popular culture" but conceded that it "over-generalizes". Gomez argued that it is "hard to resist its hopeful vision for our children and future."Millennials Rising ascribes seven "core traits" to Millennials: special, sheltered, confident, team-oriented, conventional, pressured, and achieving. A 2009, Chronicle of Higher Education report commented Howe and Strauss based these core traits on a "hodgepodge of anecdotes, statistics, and pop-culture references" and on surveys of approximately 600 high-school seniors from Fairfax County, Virginia, an affluent county with median household income approximately twice the national average. The report described Millennials Rising as a "good-news revolution" making "sweeping predictions" and describing Millennials as "rule followers who were engaged, optimistic, and downright pleasant", commenting the "book gave educators and tens of millions of parents, a warm feeling, saying who wouldn't want to hear that their kids are special?"

General
In 2006, Frank Giancola wrote an article in Human Resource Planning that stated "the emphasis on generational differences is not generally borne out by empirical research, despite its popularity".

In 2016 an article was published that explains the differences in generations, observed with the employer's position, through the development of working conditions, initiated by the employer. This development is due to the competition of firms on the job market for receiving more highly skilled workers. New working conditions as a product on the market have a classic product life-cycle and when they become widespread standard expectations of employees change accordingly.

One criticism of Strauss and Howe's theory and generational studies is that conclusions are overly broad and do not reflect the reality of every person in each generation regardless of their race, color, national origin, religion, sex, age, disability, or genetic information.> For example, Hoover cited the case of Millennials by writing that "commentators have tended to slap the Millennial label on white, affluent teenagers who accomplish great things as they grow up in the suburbs, who confront anxiety when applying to super-selective colleges, and who multitask with ease as their helicopter parents hover reassuringly above them. The label tends not to appear in renderings of teenagers who happen to be minorities, poor, or who have never won a spelling bee. Nor does the term often refer to students from big cities and small towns that are nothing like Fairfax County, Va., or who lack technological know-how. Or who struggle to complete high school. Or who never even consider college. Or who commit crimes. Or who suffer from too little parental support. Or who drop out of college. Aren't they Millennials too?" In their 2000 book Millennials Rising they brought attention to the Millennial children of immigrants in the United States, "who face daunting challenges." They wrote "one-third have no health insurance, live below the poverty line and live in overcrowded housing".

In a February 2017 article from Quartz two journalists commented on the theory saying: "it is too vague to be proven wrong, and has not been taken seriously by most professional historians. But it is superficially compelling, and plots out to some degree how America's history has unfolded since its founding". In an April 2017 article from Politico, David Greenberg, a professor of history and media studies at Rutgers University, described Strauss–Howe generational theory as "crackpot theories". A May 2017 article from Quartz described the Strauss–Howe generational theory as "pseudoscience". Peter Turchin, a scientist and specialist in the fields of cultural evolution, cliodynamics and structural-demographic theory, has criticized the theory, stating that it is not a scientific theory and that it is more akin to a prophecy since it "forces the historical record to fit a postulated cycle by stretching in some places and cutting off a bit here and there in others".

In popular culture
American electronic musician Oneohtrix Point Never was inspired by The Fourth Turning for the concept of his 2018 album Age Of and its accompanying performance installation MYRIAD.

Will Arbery's play Heroes of the Fourth Turning, first produced at New York's Playwrights Horizons in 2019, is inspired by the theories of Strauss and Howe, and the character Teresa is a vocal proponent of them.

The 2022 Netflix series The Watcher features a scene citing postulations from The Fourth Turning''.

See also
Anacyclosis
Cyclical theory
Dependency ratio
Historic recurrence
Kondratiev wave
Malthusian crisis
Population cycle
Social cycle theory
Tytler cycle
War economy
Yuga

Notes

References

Bibliography
books

External links
 Discussion forum of the Strauss and Howe generation theory 

1991 introductions
Cultural generations
Cyclical theories
Historiography of the United States
Business cycle theories
Pseudoscience